"I Don't Want You to Go" is a song written by Bruce Roberts and Allee Willis. It has been recorded by a number of different artists.

Lani Hall version
The song was published on May 7, 1980 and its copyright registered on June 30 of that year. "I Don't Want You to Go" first appeared on Lani Hall's studio album Blush in 1980. It wasn't until 1983 that the song, modified by Herb Alpert, was released as a single for her album Collectibles...

Personnel
Harvey Mason - drums
Gary Ferguson - drums
David Hungate - bass
Jeremy Lubbock - keyboards, instrumental arrangement
Michael Boddicker - synthesizers
Gerald Vinci - concertmaster
Jules Chaikin - contractor
Background vocals: David Lasley, Arnold McCuller, Marcy Levy, Tommy Funderburk, Sharon Reid, Allee Willis, Lani Hall

La Toya Jackson version

"I Don't Want You to Go" is the second single from American singer La Toya Jackson's second album My Special Love.
It was released on 7" format with the album track "Love Song" as its B-side. Jackson performed "I Don't Want You to Go" on the October 10, 1981 episode of Soul Train. AllMusic reviewer Justin Kantor praised Jackson's vocal performances on the other songs on My Special Love but said that her performance of "I Don't Want You to Go" "isn't up to the task."

Track listing
US 7" vinyl (PD 2188DJ)
"I Don't Want You to Go" - 3:58
 "Love Song" - 4:03

Other versions
Tanya Tucker included the song on her 1983 album Changes.

A popular song in the Philippines, it has been covered by a number of local artists, including the following:
Sharon Cuneta covered the song on her 1981 album Dear Heart and again on her 2006 album Isn't It Romantic? under Sony-BMG. The song is a staple of Cuneta's repertoire. Of the songs on Isn't It Romantic, "I Don't Want You to Go" was called "the best of the lot" by the Philippine Headline News Online.
Martin Nievera included it on his 1999 album Forever, Forever.
Mark Bautista recorded a version of the song and included it on his 2007 album Every Now and Then. The Philippine Daily Inquirer offered a mixed review of Bautista's performance of the song, calling it "serviceable" and "emotionally pared down."
Kyla recorded the song for her 2007 album Heartfelt.
Piolo Pascual recorded the song for the soundtrack of the 2009 film Love Me Again.
Regine Velasquez performed the song on October 25, 2009 for the television program SOP.

References 

1980 songs
1981 singles
1983 singles
Lani Hall songs
La Toya Jackson songs
Songs written by Allee Willis
Songs written by Bruce Roberts (singer)
A&M Records singles
Polydor Records singles
Pop ballads